George Herms (born 1935) is an American artist best known for creating assemblages out of discarded, often rusty, dirty or broken every-day objects, and juxtaposing those objects so as to infuse them with poetry, humor and meaning. He is also known for his works on paper, including works with ink, collage, drawing, paint and poetry.  The prolific Herms has also created theater pieces, about which he has said, "I treat it as a Joseph Cornell box big enough that you can walk around in. It's just a continuation of my sculpture, one year at a time."  Legendary curator Walter Hopps, who  met Herms in 1956, "placed Herms on a dazzling continuum of assemblage artists that includes Pablo Picasso, Kurt Schwitters, Marcel Duchamp, and Joseph Cornell, as well as California luminaries Wallace Berman and Edward Kienholz."  Often called a member of the West Coast Beat movement, Herms said that Wallace Berman taught him that "any object, even a mundane cast-off, could be of great interest if contextualized properly." "That’s my whole thing," Herms says. "I turn shit into gold. I just really want to see something I've never seen before."  George Herms lives and works in Los Angeles.

Early life and education
George Herms was born in 1935 in Woodland, California. His grandfather was an entomologist and one-time mayor of Berkeley, California, and his father was an agronomist. During World War II, Herms was sent by his parents to the College of Engineering at Berkeley, which he left after approximately six weeks when "the football season was over."

Subsequently, he worked for Remington Rand, on the Universal Automatic Computer (UNIVAC), before leaving for Mexico and other travels. His parents offered him $100 per month to return to college, so he took the money and "bought some jazz records and lived on $13 per month," and returned to Los Angeles, living for some time in Topanga Canyon, where he met the artists Wallace Berman on the occasion of his 20th birthday. Herms helped Wallace Berman hang his first show in 1957 at Ferus Gallery. Reportedly, Herms decided to become an artist when a transient sat down next to him in a Sacramento bus depot and said, "There's the makers, the takers, and the fakers. Which will you be?"  Herms did not have a formal art school education, yet he has been called the "godfather of West Coast assemblage art." During the late 1950s, Herms resided in a number of different cities in California, including Berkeley, Larkspur and Hermosa Beach before returning for a short period of time to Topanga in 1961. In 1959, Herms became an original member of Bruce Conner's Rat Bastard Protective Association.

Teaching and residencies
Herms has been a lecturer in Studio Art at University of California, Irvine, and University of California, Los Angeles (UCLA); Sculpture at UCLA and University of California, San Diego; and, Public Art at the Santa Monica College of Design, Art and Architecture. From 1977 to 1979, he was a Visiting Artist at California State University, Fullerton. In 1981, Herms was an artist in residence at the University of Denver in Colorado, and in 1991 an artist in residence at The Robbins Foundation in Philadelphia, Pennsylvania. In 1994, he was an artist in residence at Otis College of Art and Design in Los Angeles.

Selected exhibitions

Solo exhibitions
One of George Herms's earliest solo shows, "Secret Exhibitions," was mounted in 1957 in Hermosa Beach. Herms has been the subject of many other one-person exhibitions, including shows organized by the Semina Gallery in Larkspur, California (1960); the Batman Gallery in San Francisco (1961); two shows at Rolf Nelson Gallery in Los Angeles (1963, 1966); two shows at the Molly Barnes Gallery (1969, 1970); a retrospective of works from 1960 to 1972 at California State University, Los Angeles (1972) and the Memorial Union Art Gallery at UC Davis (1973), for which catalogues were produced; a show at TJB Gallery in Newport Beach, California (1975) called "Pseudonymphia" and featuring the work of several of Herms's imaginary artists such as Paul Mistrie, Eric Hammerscoffer, Iris Firewater, Sigmund Fletcher, and Astropoet Moonstone (Tarzan Feathers was not included in the show); several shows at L.A. Louver in Venice, California (1976, 1982, 1986, 1989); a retrospective exhibition at Newport Harbor Art Museum in Newport Beach, California (1979), which traveled and for which a catalogue was produced; a show at the Orange County Center for Contemporary Art in Santa Ana, California (1980); an exhibition at the University of Denver Art Gallery (1981); a show at California State University at Fullerton (1984); a show at the Oscarsson/Siegeltuch Gallery in New York (1986); a show at the Tyler Gallery at Temple University in Philadelphia (1988); a retrospective organized at the Los Angeles Municipal Art Gallery for which a catalogue was produced (1992); a show at Redbud Gallery in Houston, Texas (2002); a show at Seraphin Gallery, Philadelphia (2002), for which a catalogue was produced; two shows at Ace Gallery in Los Angeles (2003, 2004); a retrospective exhibition curated by Walter Hopps at the Santa Monica Museum of Art (2005); a show at Franklin Parrasch Gallery in New York (2006); a show at Galerie Vallois, Paris (2007); a show at Susan Inglett Gallery, New York (2008); an avant-garde "jazz opera" performed at REDCAT Gallery, CalArts’ experimental art venue (2011); and a show at OHWOW Gallery in Los Angeles (2013).

Group exhibitions
George Herms's work has been selected for group exhibitions, beginning with the "Gangbang" exhibition in 1960 at the Batman Gallery in San Francisco.

The following year George Herms was included in the ground-breaking exhibition "The Art of Assemblage" at the Museum of Modern Art in New York, which traveled to a number of other venues and produced a catalog, and Herms's work was selected for inclusion in "Object Makers" at Pomona College in Claremont. In 1963, his work appeared in the group exhibition "California Collage Show" at the Pasadena Museum of Art in Pasadena, California and was also selected for "Fifty California Artists," an exhibition at the Whitney Museum of American Art in New York, which exhibition traveled and produced a catalog. In 1964, his work was included in "Sterling Holloway Collection" at UCLA. In 1967, he participated in the group exhibition"Selection, 1967: Recent Acquisitions in Modern Art," at the University of California, Berkeley. The next year, the University of California at Irvine chose Herms's works for "Assemblage in California."

Following his participation in other major group exhibitions in the 1960s, Herms continued to be selected for major group exhibitions in the 1970s, including: "Tableaux d'Aujourd'hui" at Maitre Binoche in Paris (1971); "Surrealism is Alive and Well in the West," at the Baxter Gallery at Caltech in Pasadena, California (1972), which produced a catalogue; "Kurt Schwitters and Related Developments," at the La Jolla Museum of Contemporary Art (1973); "Poets of the Cities of New York and San Francisco 1950–1965," Dallas Museum of Fine Arts (1974), which traveled and produced a catalogue; and, in 1974, Herms was selected for exhibitions at Giancarlo Bocchi Gallery in Milan, Italy, Nicholas Wilder Gallery in Los Angeles, and by the Otis Library, at the Otis Art Institute in Los Angeles, California; "Other Voices" at Mount Holyoke College in Massachusetts (1975); "Assemblage' and "3 Los Angeles Sculptors" at the Los Angeles Institute of Contemporary Art (1975); "Great Egg Sale" at the Newport Harbor Art Museum (1976); "Painting and Sculpture in California: The Modern Era" at the San Francisco Museum of Modern Art (1976–77), which traveled and was catalogued; "3 Generations-Studies in Collage," Margo Leavin Gallery in Los Angeles (1978); and "100 + Directions in Southern California Art, Los Angeles Institute of Contemporary Art (1978).

Herms was included in a number of important group exhibitions in the 1980s, including "Recent Acquisitions" at the Newport Harbor Art Museum (1980); "Major Works" at L.A. Louver Gallery (1980); "Sculpture in California 1975–80" at the San Diego Art Museum in San Diego, California (1980), which produced a catalogue; "Furnishings by Artists" at the Art Gallery at Otis Art Institute of the Parsons School of Design in Los Angeles (1980), which produced a catalogue; "Southern California Artists 1940–1980" at the Laguna Beach Museum of Art in Laguna Beach, California (1981), which produced a catalogue; "Collage and Assemblage" at the Mississippi Museum of Art in Jackson, Mississippi (1981), which traveled and produced a catalogue; a group show at Los Angeles Contemporary Exhibitions (LACE) (1981); "Humor in Art" at the Los Angeles Institute of Contemporary Art (1981); "California: A Sense of Individualism" at L.A. Louver Gallery in Venice, California (1981); "California: The State of Landscape 1972–1981" at Newport Harbor Art Museum (1981), which traveled and produced a catalogue; "The West as Art" at Palm Springs Desert Museum in Palm Springs, California (1982), which produced a catalogue; "Contemporary Triptychs" at Galleries of the Claremont Colleges in Claremont (1982); "American/European Painting and Sculpture" at L.A. Louver Gallery (1983); "Boxed Art" at Laguna Beach Museum of Art (1983); "Annual Exhibition, American Academy in Rome" in Rome, Italy (1983), which traveled and produced a catalogue; "Collage, The Americans" at The Museum of Fine Arts in Houston, Texas (1983), which produced a catalogue; "Contemporary Collage: Extensions" at Galleries of the Claremont Colleges (1983), which produced a catalogue; "Narrative Sculpture" at Palm Springs Desert Museum (1984), which produced a catalogue; "American/European: Painting, Drawing, and Sculpture" at L.A. Louver Gallery (1984); "Gala, Gala" at The Museum of Contemporary Art (MOCA), Los Angeles (1985); "American/European: Painting and Sculpture" at L.A. Louver Gallery (1985); "San Francisco: 1945–1965" at the Oakland Museum in Oakland, California (1985), which produced a catalogue; "Sculpture and Sculptor's Drawings" at the L.A. Louver Gallery (1986); "Shrines and Altars" at Kohler Arts Center in Sheboygan, Wisconsin (1986); "Recent Acquisitions" at the Los Angeles County Museum of Art (LACMA) in Los Angeles (1987); "Assemblage" at Kent Fine Art, Inc. in New York (1987), which produced a catalogue; "Artists Against AIDS" at Pacific Design Center in Los Angeles (1988), which produced a catalogue; "Loans from the Norton Simon Museum" at LACMA (1988); "Poetic Objects" at the San Antonio Museum of Art in San Antonio, Texas (1988–89), which traveled and produced a catalogue; "Rezoning (bill bissett, George Herms, Jess and Al Neil)" at Vancouver Art Gallery in British Columbia, Canada (1989), which produced a catalogue; "Artists Against AIDS" at Pacific Design Center (1989), which produced a catalogue; "The 'Junk Aesthetic': Assemblage of the 1950s and Early 1960s" at the Whitney Museum of American Art, Fairfield County Branch in Stamford, Connecticut (1989), which traveled; and "Forty Years of California Assemblage" at the Wight Art Gallery at UCLA (1989), which traveled and produced a catalogue.

Herms participated in major group exhibitions in the 1990s, including "The Denim Jacket Show" at the Newport Harbor Art Museum (1990); "Novel Ideas" at the Laguna Art Museum in Laguna Beach (1990); "Crossing the Line: Word and Image in Art" at the Montgomery Gallery at Pomona College in Claremont, California (1990); "Artist's Artists" at Long Beach Museum of Art in Long Beach, California (1990); "Wallace Berman, Bruce Conner, Jay DeFeo, George Herms and Jess" at Nicole Klagsbrun Gallery, New York (1991); "California Artist's Books" at The Armory Center in Pasadena, California (1991); "Poem Makers: Wallace Berman, George Herms and Jess" at L.A. Louver Gallery in Los Angeles (1992); and, "Sight, Vision: The Urban Milieu #3 (Wallace Berman, Bruce Conner, Jay DeFeo, Wally Hedrick, George Herms, and Jess") at Gallery Paule Anglim in San Francisco (1992).  In 2011, Herms was the focus of a group show at the Museum of Contemporary Art at the Pacific Design Center in Los Angeles entitled "Xenophilia (Love of the Unknown)." Herms work was included in the 2016-2017 exhibition "Based on a True Story: Highlights from the di Rosa Collection" at di Rosa, Napa, curated by Amy Owen.

Public art
George Herms has had public art commissions, including "Clock Tower Monument in Unknown" at the MacArthur Public Art Program in Los Angeles (1987); "Moon Dial" in Beverly Hills, California (1988); and, "Portals to Poetry" in Citicorp Plaza in Los Angeles (1989).

Visiting artist, artist residencies and teaching 
 2009 Lecturer in Drawing and Painting, California State University, Fullerton, CA
 2006 Artist-in-Residence, Skowhegan School of Painting and Sculpture, Madison, ME
 1991-98 Taught Sculpture, Santa Monica College of Design, Art and Architecture, Santa Monica, CA
 1994 Taught Sculpture, Otis Parsons, Los Angeles, CA
 1991 Artist in Residence, The Robbins Foundation, Philadelphia, PA
 1987-94 Lecturer, University of California, Los Angeles, CA
 1987 Taught Sculpture, Otis Parsons, Los Angeles, CA1985  Lecturer, University of California, San Diego, CA
 1981 Artist in Residence, University of Denver, CO. 
 1980-81 Lecturer, University of California, Los Angeles, CA
 1977-79 Visiting Artist, California State University, Fullerton, CA
 1976 Lecturer in Studio Art, University of California, Irvine, CA

Awards and honors
In 1962, artist Jess Collins and poet Robert Duncan awarded George Herms the "Servant of Holy Beauty" award. The National Endowment for the Arts Herms received three Individual Fellowships in 1968, 1977 and 1984, respectively. Herms was also awarded the Rome Prize, Fellowship in Sculpture from The American Academy in Rome from 1982 to 1983. Herms was subsequently granted a John Simon Guggenheim Fellowship in Sculpture from 1983 to 1984. In 1987, he was awarded a Working Grant from the Pollock Krasner Foundation and, in 1989, he was a Finalist in the "Pico Seagate" competition. Herms also received the 1998 Adolph and Esther Gottlieb Foundation Award and a Fellowship at the Getty Research Institute in 2000.

Notes

External links 
 George Herms papers at the Getty Research Institute, Los Angeles. Accession No. 2009.M.20. The bulk of the papers comprise full documentation of Herms's life and work from 1960–2000.

1935 births
Living people
Beat Generation people
Assemblage artists
People from Woodland, California
University of California, Berkeley alumni
Artists from Los Angeles